The Women's pentathlon event  at the 2007 European Athletics Indoor Championships was held on March 2.

Medalists

Results

References
Results

Combined events at the European Athletics Indoor Championships
Pentathlon
2007 in women's athletics